In their -year history, the Boston Celtics have selected the following players in the National Basketball Association (NBA) draft and previously in the Basketball Association of America draft.

Notes

References

Boston Celtics Draft Register at Basketball-Reference.com

 
National Basketball Association draft
Basketball Association of America draft
draft history